Alexander Petrie may refer to:

 Alexander Petrie (architect)

 Alexander Petrie (classicist)
 Alexander Petrie (minister)
 Alexander Petrie (rugby union)